Helmy Eltoukhy is an American scientist, entrepreneur, and investor best known for his contributions to genomics, semiconductor DNA sequencing, and personalized medicine. The co-founder of startups Avantome and Guardant Health, Eltoukhy was named to Time Magazine’s inaugural 50 Most Influential People in Healthcare (2018) and Fortune’s 40 under 40 (2017). Acquired by Illumina in 2008, Avantome was founded to develop and commercialize semiconductor-based DNA sequencing, during the race for the $1,000 genome. Guardant Health was founded to pioneer non-invasive liquid biopsy approaches for cancer diagnosis, monitoring, personalized medicine treatment, and research.

Education
Eltoukhy attended Bellarmine College Preparatory, studying college level math during his freshman year, and graduating in 1997. Subsequently, Eltoukhy studied electrical engineering at Stanford University, completing an accelerated Bachelor of Science (BS) in two and a half years, followed by Master of Science (MS) and Doctorate (PhD) degrees. Eltoukhy’s doctoral thesis, “An integrated system for de novo DNA sequencing” research was completed in the laboratory of Abbas El Gamal, for a project that combined genomics and sensor engineering. Eltoukhy discovered that low cost CMOS image sensors coupled to light-emitting DNA sequencing reactions could form the basis for building a less expensive, portable DNA sequencer.

Personal Life 
On 09/18/2020 Carson Eltoukhy filed a Family - Marriage Dissolution/Divorce lawsuit against Helmy Eltoukhy.

Career

Genome Technology Center
After graduation, Eltoukhy completed a post-doctoral fellowship at Stanford University’s Genome Technology Center, investigating low-cost DNA sequencing technologies as part of the Human Genome Project. Eltoukhy’s research focused on developing new assays and detection methods, with an emphasis on semiconductor-based approaches for DNA sequencing. That research was funded, in part, by one of the first National Human Genome Research Institute grants awarded for massive parallel sequencing (also known as Next Generation Sequencing or NGS).

Avantome and Illumina
In 2007, Eltoukhy and Mostafa Ronaghi co-founded the biotechnology startup company Avantome, to accelerate the commercialization of semiconductor sequencing technologies and affordable high-throughput DNA sequencing. Eltoukhy was president and CEO of the new company until 2008, when Avantome was acquired by Illumina. As part of the acquisition terms, Ronaghi and Eltoukhy joined Illumina, where Eltoukhy continued pioneering genomic research as director of Advanced Sequencing Development until 2012. At Illumina, Avantome’s CMOS/semiconductor sequencing platform became the basis for Project Firefly, a program to develop an "integrated sequencing solution simple and affordable enough to install in hospitals for routine testing". In 2018, Illumina launched iSEQ, a new product developed using Avantome’s CMOS sensor approach combined with nanowell technology; iSEQ delivered on the original Avantome goals of low cost instrumentation and reduced per-sample processing cost in a long read format.

Guardant Health
In 2012, Eltoukhy and AmirAli Talasaz co-founded Guardant Health, established to "forge a new frontier" in cancer detection and treatment using artificial intelligence and a big data approach. They developed new methods to detect and monitor the low levels of circulating tumor DNA (ctDNA) fragments released into the bloodstream of people who have cancer, enabling cancer detection and monitoring using minimally-invasive blood tests (liquid biopsies) which are lower cost and lower risk compared to traditional tissue biopsies.

Under Eltoukhy’s direction as CEO, Guardant Health raised over one billion dollars (US) in financing, launched three products, established collaborations with oncology researchers, and gained recognition as a healthcare innovator in liquid biopsy approaches used for cancer diagnosis and research. Named as a World Economic Forum Technology Pioneer and to Fierce Biotech's Fierce 15 list in 2015, the company launched Guardant360, the first commercially available comprehensive liquid biopsy for cancer in 2014. The test uses a combination of genomics and signal processing innovations to simultaneously profile the mutational signature of several  circulating tumor DNA genes in patient blood samples. By 2016, the test was in use by oncologists to guide personalized treatment plans for late-stage cancer patients, and to pair advanced cancer patients with clinical trial opportunities. The Food and Drug Administration granted Guardant360 Expedited Access Pathway status in 2018. GuardantOMNI, an expanded testing panel measuring levels of 500 circulating tumor DNA (ctDNA) genes, was launched in 2017. Released for research use in 2019, LUNAR is an assay for high sensitivity detection of changes in genomic and epigenetic signatures of ctDNA in early stage and recurring cancers.

In 2017, a venture capital funding round led by SoftBank raised $360 million, allowing Guardant Health to expand operations globally and continue to focus on accelerating progress towards early cancer detection. Eltoukhy and Talasaz rang the opening bell at the Nasdaq when Guardant Health went public (IPO) on October 4, 2018. In January 2019, Guardant Health entered a partnership with pharmaceutical company AstraZeneca to develop companion diagnostics. In October 2019, the company initiated ECLIPSE, a 10,000 patient colorectal cancer study, in an effort to evaluate the effectiveness of using blood tests to screen for colorectal cancer in the general population.

Representative Publications

Journal articles
 El Gamal A and Eltoukhy H (2005) CMOS image sensors.  IEEE Circuits and Devices Magazine 21(3), 6-20
 Eltoukhy H et al. (2006) A 0.18-/spl mu/m CMOS bioluminescence detection lab-on-chip. IEEE Journal of Solid-State Circuits 41(3)
 Lanman et al. (2015) Analytical and Clinical Validation of a Digital Sequencing Panel for Quantitative, Highly Accurate Evaluation of Cell-Free Circulating Tumor DNA. PLOS One 
 Odegaard J et al. (2018) Validation of a Plasma-Based Comprehensive Cancer Genotyping Assay Utilizing Orthogonal Tissue- and Plasma-Based Methodologies. Clinical Cancer Research 24(15) 3539-3549. 
 Zill OA et al. (2018) The Landscape of Actionable Genomic Alterations in Cell-Free Circulating Tumor DNA from 21,807 Advanced Cancer Patients. Clinical Cancer Research 24(15), 3528-3538

Patents
Engineered luciferases, (2009).
Biological analysis arrangement and approach therefor, (2012).
Multibase delivery for long reads in sequencing by synthesis protocols, (2012).
Methods and systems for detecting genetic variants, (2015).
Methods to detect rare mutations and copy number variation, (2016).
Methods for multi-resolution analysis of cell-free nucleic acids, (2017).

Recognition
Eltoukhy was named to Time Magazine’s inaugural 50 Most Influential People in Healthcare in 2018, Fortune’s 40 under 40 in 2017, and the San Francisco Business Times 40 under 40 in 2019. He has served as an invited speaker or panelist at the World Economic Forum, Fortune Brainstorm Health 2017, The Business of Personalized Medicine Summit 2018, HLTH (healthcare innovation) 2018, and the World Medical Innovation Forum 2016.

References

External links
 CNBC Power Lunch (Interview): New blood testing technology may be able to detect cancer

American technology company founders
Living people
American health care businesspeople
21st-century American biologists
Businesspeople in the health care industry
Stanford University alumni
Stanford University School of Engineering alumni
Cancer researchers
Year of birth missing (living people)